is a former Japanese football player and manager.

Playing career
Sawairi was born in Shizuoka on May 8, 1963. After graduating from Hosei University, he joined Toyota Motors (later Nagoya Grampus Eight) in 1986. He played as regular player as offensive midfielder and forward. He also served as captain. However his opportunity to play decreased from 1994 and he retired end of 1995 season.

Coaching career
After retirement, Sawairi started coaching career at Nagoya Grampus Eight in 1996. He mainly served as scout. From 2000, he coached for university and high school teams until 2008. In May 2008, he signed with JEF United Chiba and he became a coach under new manager Alex Miller. Sawairi managed in 2 matches as caretaker until Miller's registration is completed. However the club performance was bad and he was sacked with Miller in September 2009. From 2010, he managed university teams until 2014. In November 2014, he signed with Kataller Toyama and became a general manager. In August 2015, manager Yasuyuki Kishino was sacked and Sawairi became a new manager. He managed the club until end of 2015 season and left the club end of 2016 season.

Club statistics

Managerial statistics

References

External links
 
 

1963 births
Living people
Hosei University alumni
Association football people from Shizuoka Prefecture
Japanese footballers
Japan Soccer League players
J1 League players
Nagoya Grampus players
Japanese football managers
J1 League managers
J3 League managers
JEF United Chiba managers
Kataller Toyama managers
Association football forwards
Association football midfielders